Mesothen cosmosomoides is a moth of the subfamily Arctiinae. It was described by Rothschild in 1911. It is found in Suriname.

References

 Natural History Museum Lepidoptera generic names catalog

Mesothen (moth)
Moths described in 1911